Ezequiel Busquets Sanguinetti (born 24 October 2000) is a Uruguayan professional footballer who plays as a right-back for Peñarol.

Club career
Busquets played youth football for San Vicente de Chuy, a club from his hometown in the far east of Uruguay. Peñarol noticed him after a friendly match against his club in 2014. He joined Peñarol's youth section in 2015. He made his professional debut for the club on 7 June 2018 in a 3–1 league win against Defensor Sporting.

On 28 August 2020, Spanish Segunda División B club Marbella announced the signing of Busquets on a season long loan deal with option to buy.

International career
Busquets is a former Uruguayan youth international. He was part of Uruguayan squad at the 2019 South American U-20 Championship and 2019 FIFA U-20 World Cup.

Career statistics

Club

Honours
Peñarol
Uruguayan Primera División: 2018, 2021

References

External links
 

2000 births
Living people
People from Rocha Department
Association football defenders
Uruguayan footballers
Uruguay youth international footballers
Uruguay under-20 international footballers
Uruguayan Primera División players
Segunda División B players
Peñarol players
Marbella FC players
Uruguayan expatriate footballers
Uruguayan expatriate sportspeople in Spain
Expatriate footballers in Spain